The lined catshark or banded catshark (Halaelurus lineatus) is a species of catshark, belonging to the family Scyliorhinidae. It is found in the waters off the coasts of Beira, Mozambique, to East London, and South Africa between latitudes 19°S and 31°S, from the surface to 290 m. It can grow up to 56 cm in length.

References

 

lined catshark
Fish of South Africa
Marine fauna of Southern Africa
lined catshark